Takin' Mine is the debut album by rapper Heather B. It was released on June 11, 1996 through EMI Records and was almost entirely produced by Boogie Down Productions member Kenny Parker, with one song done by production group Da Beatminerz. The album was a minor success making it to 36 on the Top R&B/Hip-Hop Albums and 14 on the Top Heatseekers, and spawned three charting singles, "All Glocks Down", "If Headz Only Knew" and "My Kinda Nigga", each of which found decent success on the Hot Rap Singles chart.

Track listing
All songs produced by DJ Kenny Parker except where noted

"Da Heartbreaka"- 3:57  
"All Glocks Down"- 4:09  
"If Headz Only Knew"- 4:41  
"My Kinda Nigga"- 4:18 (featuring M.O.P.) 
"Takin' Mine"- 3:49  
"Mad Bent"- 4:19  
"Sendin 'Em Back"- 3:25  
"No Doubt"- 4:05  
"Real Niggaz Up"- 3:40  (produced by Da Beatminerz)
"What Goes On"- 4:21

Charts

References

1996 debut albums
EMI Records albums
Pendulum Records albums